Potamonautes unisulcatus is a species of crustacean in the family Potamonautidae. It is only found in the Uluguru Mountains, Tanzania.

References

Potamoidea
Freshwater crustaceans of Africa
Crustaceans described in 1933
Taxa named by Mary J. Rathbun
Taxonomy articles created by Polbot